There are two dioceses named Viana:
Roman Catholic Diocese of Viana, Angola
Roman Catholic Diocese of Viana, Brazil